Mónica Patron (born 16 April 1963) is a Mexican sports shooter. She competed in the women's 25 metre pistol event at the 1984 Summer Olympics.

References

External links
 

1963 births
Living people
Mexican female sport shooters
Olympic shooters of Mexico
Shooters at the 1984 Summer Olympics
Place of birth missing (living people)